Blackwell House is a historic house on Roosevelt Island in New York City. The house's name comes from Jacob Blackwell, who built the house in 1796. He was the great-grandson of Robert Blackwell, who in 1686 took ownership of what was then known as Manning's Island and subsequently became the island's new namesake. The house was added to the National Register of Historic Places in 1972.

See also
List of New York City Designated Landmarks in Manhattan on Islands
National Register of Historic Places listings in Manhattan on islands

References

Houses on the National Register of Historic Places in Manhattan
Houses completed in 1796
Houses in Manhattan
Roosevelt Island
1796 establishments in New York (state)
New York City Designated Landmarks in Manhattan